Canberra is Australia's capital and its largest inland city. This amounted to only 1.7% of Australia's population. The population density for Canberra is 443.5 people per sq kilometre.

At the 2016 census, 32% of Canberra's population were born overseas, a large majority which come from Asia and Europe.

The estimated population for Canberra as of 2016 was 395,790, constituting 194,879 males and 200,914 females. The 2016 unemployment rate was around 4.7%.

History 

The first few decades after the establishment of Canberra growth was relatively slow due to low funds after World War I. The population was nearly 2000 at the time. Until the end of World War II development was completely put on hold due to the Great Depression.

Office development accelerated rapidly in the 1960s in Civic. From 1960 - 1971, the population tripled from 50,000 inhabitants to 146,000 and climbing to 203,000 in 1976. The Australian economy went into recession in 1975, and a year later the construction industries in Canberra collapsed.

In modern times, the growth completely slowed in 1996 - 2001. However, the city experiences over 1 percent growth annually. The population in 2016 was around 395,790.

Populations by district 

Most of Canberra's growth since 1991 has taken place in Gungahlin.

Ancestry and immigration

At the 2016 census, the most commonly nominated ancestries were: 

The 2016 census showed that 32% of Canberra's inhabitants were born overseas. Of inhabitants born outside of Australia, the most prevalent countries of birth were England, China, India, New Zealand and the Philippines.

1.6% of the population, or 6,476 people, identified as Indigenous Australians (Aboriginal Australians and Torres Strait Islanders) in 2016.

Language
At the 2016 census, 72.7% of people spoke only English at home. The other languages most commonly spoken at home were Mandarin (3.1%), Vietnamese (1.1%), Cantonese (1%), Hindi (0.9%) and Spanish (0.8%).

Religion

At the 2011 census, the most common responses for religion were no religion (36.2%) Catholic (22.3%), Anglican (10.7%), not stated (9.1%) and Hinduism (2.6%).

Demographic Statistics
The following statistics are from the Australian Bureau of Statistics.

Median age
34 years of age

Age structure
0-14 years: 18.7% (74,213)
15–64 years: 68.7% (271,762)
65 years and over: 12.7% (49,828)

Population growth rate
1.6%

Birth rate
13.5 births/1,000 population (2010 est.)

Death rate
4.5 deaths/1,000 population (July 2010 est.)

Life expectancy
As of 2013-2015, the Australian Capital Territory has the highest life expectancy in Australia. The life expectancy at birth for males is 81.2 years and 85.3 years for females.

Sex ratios
There were 99.0 males for every 100 females in Canberra as of 2010.
Civic had the highest sex ratio (137.2 males for every 100 females.)
Deakin had the lowest sex ratio (80.6 males for every 100 females.)

Total fertility rate
1.6 children born/woman (2001 est.)

Unemployment rate
4.5%

Notes

References 

Canberra
Demographics of Australia by state or territory
Canberra